Virág Vörös (born 12 July 1999) is a Hungarian ski jumper. She is the first ski jumper representing Hungary in the World Cup, since Gábor Gellér's last start in Garmisch-Partenkirchen '89.

Career

2015: World Championships 
On 20 February 2015, she performed at FIS Nordic World Ski Championships 2015 ladies' normal hill individual event in Falun and stuck in qualification round.

2017: World Cup debut 
On 30 November 2017, she made he World Cup debut at the 2017/18 season opening in Lillehammer, where she stuck at 57th place in qualification round.

World Cup results

Standings

Individual starts (11)

External links 

1999 births
Living people
Hungarian female ski jumpers
Sportspeople from Szombathely
Ski jumpers at the 2016 Winter Youth Olympics